The 1976 congressional elections in Maryland were held on November 2, 1976, to determine who will represent the state of Maryland in the United States House of Representatives. Maryland has eight seats in the House, apportioned according to the 1970 United States Census. Representatives are elected for two-year terms; those elected served in the 95th Congress from January 3, 1977 until January 3, 1979.

Overview

|- style="background-color: #e9e9e9; font-weight: bold;"
! scope="row" colspan="2" style="text-align: right;" | Totals
| style="text-align: right;" | 8
| style="text-align: right;" | 0
| style="text-align: right;" | 0
| style="text-align: right;" | —
| style="text-align: right;" | 100%
| style="text-align: right;" | 100%
| style="text-align: right;" | 1,315,871
| style="text-align: right;" |
|}

References

External links
 Maryland State Board of Elections

1976
Maryland
United States House of Representatives